This is a list of all managers who have appeared in the FIFA World Cup, the most prestigious tournament for national teams in association football. Over 370 individuals have managed or co-managed a team in at least one match in the competition.

Statistics and notable achievements
Carlos Alberto Parreira is the manager who has taken part in the most editions of the tournament, six from 1982 to 2010. Parreira also shares with Bora Milutinović the record for most different nations managed in the World Cup, with five. Helmut Schön holds the records for both most matches managed (25) and most matches won (16), all with West Germany in 1966–1978.

Twenty-one managers have won the World Cup, with Vittorio Pozzo being the only one to do so twice, in 1934 and 1938 with Italy.

The first person who had the roles of both a player and a manager in the tournament is Milorad Arsenijević, who played for Yugoslavia in 1930 and then coached them in 1950. Three men who lifted the trophy as players went on to also triumph as managers: Brazil's Mário Zagallo in 1970, West Germany's Franz Beckenbauer in 1990 and France's Didier Deschamps in 2018.

The youngest manager to appear in the competition is Juan José Tramutola, who co-managed Argentina at age 27 in 1930, while the oldest is Otto Rehhagel, who was in charge of Greece at age 71 in 2010.

While many of the participating nations have on one or more occasions employed foreign managers for the World Cup, the two teams with the most appearances, Brazil and Germany, have always been led by natives. On the other side of the spectrum, Ecuador is the team with the most participations always coached by foreigners – four, always with managers coming from fellow South American countries. No foreign manager has ever won the World Cup, and only two have reached the final match: George Raynor of England, with Sweden in 1958, and Ernst Happel of Austria, with the Netherlands in 1978.

By team
The teams are listed in decreasing order of number of appearances in the World Cup.

Brazil

Germany
Including West Germany (1954–1990).

Argentina

Italy

Mexico

England

France

Spain

Belgium

Uruguay

Serbia
Including Yugoslavia until 1990 and Serbia and Montenegro (FR Yugoslavia) in 1998–2006.

Sweden

Switzerland

Netherlands

Russia
Including Soviet Union until 1990.

South Korea

United States

Chile

Czech Republic
Including Czechoslovakia until 1990.

Hungary

Poland

Cameroon

Paraguay

Portugal

Scotland

Austria

Bulgaria

Japan

Romania

Australia

Colombia

Costa Rica

Croatia

Denmark

Iran

Morocco

Nigeria

Saudi Arabia

Tunisia

Peru

Algeria

Ecuador

Ghana

Bolivia

Egypt

Greece

Honduras

Ivory Coast

Northern Ireland

Norway

Republic of Ireland

Senegal

South Africa

Canada

El Salvador

New Zealand

North Korea

Slovenia

Turkey

Wales

Angola

Bosnia and Herzegovina

China

Cuba

DR Congo
Participated as Zaire in 1974.

East Germany

Haiti

Iceland

Indonesia
Participated as Dutch East Indies in 1938.

Iraq

Israel

Jamaica

Kuwait

Panama

Qatar

Slovakia

Togo

Trinidad and Tobago

Ukraine

United Arab Emirates

By year

Flags indicate the managers' nationalities, while FIFA trigrammes indicate the teams they were in charge of.

Record appearances

The below table lists the records of all managers who have appeared in either:
 a final match, or
 10 or more matches, or
 3 or more World Cups

Key: ; ; ; ; ; .

As per statistical convention in football, matches decided in extra time are counted as wins and losses, while matches decided by penalty shoot-outs are counted as draws.

Notes

References

External links
 World Cup 1930-2018 - Info on Coaches, RSSSF
 FIFA World Cup at FIFA.com 

managers
World Cup